Him & Her is a British television sitcom about a lazy twenty-something couple: Steve and Becky, who live in Walthamstow, London. It was first broadcast in the United Kingdom on BBC Three on 6 September 2010. It is written by Stefan Golaszewski and stars Russell Tovey and Sarah Solemani. The theme tune is the song "Boom Bang-a-Bang" by Lulu.

The first series aired from 6 September to 11 October 2010, and comprised six episodes. The second series aired from 1 November to 13 December 2011, and comprised seven episodes. The third series aired from 18 November to 23 December 2012, comprising seven episodes, including a 'special' Christmas episode.

The fourth (and final) series aired from 21 November to 19 December 2013 and comprised five episodes. Series 4 (subtitled "The Wedding") is based around Laura and Paul's wedding ceremony and reception, rather than the flat where Steve and Becky live.

Series overview 
 Series 1
Becky and Steve are happy to spend their days watching DVDs in Steve's flat, but are constantly interrupted by Dan (the man who lives upstairs), Laura and Paul (Becky's sister and her fiancé), and Becky's parents.
 Series 2
Becky moves into Steve's flat permanently.  Becky's sister Laura and her friend Shelly have become best friends with Steve's ex-girlfriend. Dan is back with his horrid girlfriend.
 Series 3
Steve contemplates proposing to Becky, but struggles to find the right moment. Becky's sister Laura is pregnant, and is letting everyone know about it.  Meanwhile, the relationship between Shelly and Dan continues to blossom.
 Series 4
The series focuses on Paul and Laura's wedding day. Each episode follows a different stage of the day, with Becky as chief bridesmaid and Steve as best man, from the early morning wake up call, through the ceremony and the speeches, to the late-night disco. Becky finds out she's pregnant with Steve's baby.

Cast

Main cast
 Becky Williams (Sarah Solemani; 25 episodes), Steve's partner
 Steve Marshall (Russell Tovey; 25 episodes), Becky's partner
 Dan Perkins (Joe Wilkinson; 25 episodes), Steve & Becky's neighbour, Shelly's partner
 Laura Parker (Kerry Howard; 24 episodes), Becky's sister and Paul's wife
 Paul Parker (Ricky Champ; 23 episodes), Laura's husband and Graham's boyfriend
 Shelly Mills (Camille Coduri; 18 episodes), Laura's friend and Dan's partner

Guest cast
 Nigel Williams (Ralph Brown; 8 episodes), Becky and Laura's father
 Graham (Paul Clayton; 6 episodes), Paul's boyfriend
 Kieran Mills (Louis Melton; 6 episodes), Shelly's son
 Janet Marshall (Joanna Bacon; 5 episodes), Steve's mother
 Jill Williams (Marion Bailey; 5 episodes), Becky and Laura's mother
 Lee (Nick Blood; 5 episodes), Becky's ex-boyfriend
 Ian (Jonny Sweet; 5 episodes), Paul's biological half-brother
 Bianca (Georgia Eracleous; 5 episodes), Laura's cousin and bridesmaid
 Mike (Ian Burfield; 4 episodes), Barney's father and Janet's partner
 Luke Parker (Reiss McRaye; 4 episodes), Paul's son
 Keith (Thomas Coombes; 4 episodes), Paul's friend
 Dennis (James Doherty; 4 episodes), Becky and Laura's uncle
 Sue (Victoria Willing; 4 episodes), Becky and Laura's aunt
 David (Neal Barry; 4 episodes)
 Darren (Josef Altin; 3 episodes), Paul's friend
 Gina (Diane Morgan; 3 episodes), Steve and Becky's neighbour
 Julie Taylor (Katie Lyons; 2 episodes), Steve's ex-girlfriend
 Anita (Beverly Rudd; 2 episodes), Dan's ex-girlfriend
 Barney (Blake Harrison; 2 episodes), Steve's friend and Mike's son
 Bernadette Parker (Elizabeth and Harriet Mayes; 2 episodes), Paul and Laura's baby daughter
 Jonathan (Neil Edmond; 2 episodes), Steve and Becky's neighbour
 Pete Marshall (Christopher Fulford; 1 episode), Steve's father
 Jamie (Martin Delaney; 1 episode), Becky's friend
 Lorraine (Kerry Godliman; 1 episode), Laura's wedding make-up artist
 Gay Allen (Nathasha Stokes; 1 episode), Barney's girlfriend
 Paris (Lizzie Roper; 1 episode), a prostitute Dan hires
 Mrs Bailey (Eve Pearce; 1 episode); Steve and Becky's neighbour
 Paul (Lee Long; 1 episode), Paul's friend, known as "Other Paul"
 Rashid (Seelan Gunaseelan; 1 episode), a waiter at Paul and Laura's wedding

Critical reception
Most critics in the UK responded warmly to the first series; although there was some mild criticism directed towards the more crude and naturalistic aspects of the programme, reviewers reacted positively to the quality of writing and acting found on the show. In the Metro Keith Watson summed it up as "sleazy fun [but] not without a certain soiled charm", while in The Independent Brian Viner compared the set-up to that of the popular British sitcom The Royle Family, describing Him and Her as "beautifully acted... wonderfully written... and intermittently very funny indeed". In one of the more negative reviews, David Crawford of the Radio Times was a little more reserved in his praise of the show; although he admitted that "the chemistry between the two leads... [gives the] filthy comedy a warm-hearted edge" he also expressed distaste for the "lewd and crude" humour frequently on display.

In respect to the writing, The Guardian labelled the series "a witty, touching show" that "has the feel of a series of short plays", while in The Radio Times Claire Webb noted how as the series progressed she found it to be "more Beckett play than the [usual] zany fare you might expect from a BBC3 sitcom.

On reviewing the final episode, Aidan Smith of The Scotsman summarised the show as "a jam and fluff-covered gem featuring charming performances from Russell Tovey and Sarah Solemani as Steve and Becky". The series was awarded the BAFTA for British Academy Television Award for Best Situation Comedy in 2014.

Episodes

Series overview

Series 1 (2010)

Series 2 (2011)

Series 3 (2012)

Series 4 (2013)

Home media
The complete first series DVD was released on 18 October 2010 and the second series on 12 November 2012. A series 1 & 2 boxset was also released on 12 November 2012. The complete third series DVD was released on 9 December 2013, and the fourth series on 13 October 2014, as well as a complete Series 1-4 collection.

References

External links
 
 
 

2010 British television series debuts
2013 British television series endings
2010s British LGBT-related comedy television series
2010s British romantic comedy television series
2010s British sitcoms
BAFTA winners (television series)
BBC romance television shows
BBC television sitcoms
Bisexuality-related television series
English-language television shows
Infidelity in television
Television series about couples
Television series about dysfunctional families
Television series about siblings
Television series by Big Talk Productions
Television series by ITV Studios
Television shows set in London
Walthamstow